During the 1975–76 English football season, Leicester City F.C. competed in the Football League First Division.

Season summary
The 1975–76 season started very poorly for the Foxes as they went on a 15-game winless run that saw them languishing in the relegation places but after a 3–2 home win over Burnley in November which ended that run, matters picked up healthily which saw Leicester finish in a satisfying and comfortable 7th place.

Final league table

Results
Leicester City's score comes first

Legend

Football League First Division

FA Cup

League Cup

Anglo-Scottish Cup

Squad

References

Leicester City F.C. seasons
Leicester City